, is a Japanese photographer who has specialized in the photography of art.

Okamura was born on 13 December 1927 in Kichijōji, Tokyo. He studied architecture at Nihon University from 1948. Okamura was a keen and proficient skier (skiing as a representative of Japan in Chamonix in 1959), and a photographer of skiing. In 1960 he became a professional photographer, also writing about photography and skiing.

Okamura moved to Rome in 1965 and since that time has specialized in photographing buildings, frescos, and works of art, frequently contributing the photographs to lavishly produced books.

Books by Okamura

 Asama Kōgen: Karuizawa, Takamie, Shikazawa, Kōzu, Arafune, Myōgisan. Blue Guidebooks. Tokyo: Jitsugyō-no-Nihon-sha, 1961.
 Sukī no te hodoki. Fujisawa: Ikeda Shoten, 1961.
 Sukī o hajimeru hito no tame ni (For the beginner at skiing). Fujisawa: Ikeda Shoten, 1962.
 Kamera o hajimeru hito no tame ni (For the beginner with a camera). Fujisawa: Ikeda Shoten, 1962. Cowritten with Fumio Iijima.
 Kamera shiki no torikata (Using a camera in the four seasons). Fujisawa: Ikeda Shoten, 1963.
 Karuizawa to Asamayama (Karuizawa and Asamayama). Blue Guidebooks. Tokyo: Jitsugyō-no-Nihon-sha, 1967. Cowritten with Masao Izumi.
 Rōma no funsui (The fountains of Rome). Tokyo: Kajima Shuppankai, 1975. Edited by Ume Kajima.
 Jutai kokuchi (The annunciation). Tokyo: Kajima Shuppankai, 1977. . Edited by Shūji Takashina. 
 Mikeranjero no Vatikan hekiga: Okamura Takashi Shashinten / The Vatican Frescoes of Michelangelo. Catalogue of an exhibition held August–September 1980 in the Seibu gallery, Ikebukuro. Despite the English alternative title, all in Japanese.
The Vatican Frescoes of Michelangelo. 2 vols. Abbeville, 1980. . Edition of 400. Text by André Chastel.
 Mikeranjero Vatikan hekiga. (Italian title Gli affreschi di Michelangelo nel Vaticano.) 2 vols. Tokyo: Kōdansha, 1980. Edition of 200. 
 Mikeranjero Vatikan kyūden hekiga. Tokyo: Kōdansha, 1981. Text by Yasuo Kamon. 
 Delfi. Il santuario della Grecia. Mondadori, 1981.
 Delphes: le sanctuaire d'Apollon. Robert Laffont, 1985. .
 Delphi: Das Heiligtum der Griechen. Freiburg: Herder, 1982. .
 Assisi. Die mystische Welt des heiligen Franziskus. Herder, 1982.  . Text by Gerhard Ruf.
 Rom die Stadt der Päpste. Die Welt der Religionen, 11. Freiburg im Breisgau: Herder. 1983. . Text by Francesco Paolo Rizzo.
 Les hauts lieux de la spiritualité. Robert Laffont, 1985. Text by  Francesco Paolo Rizzo. 
 Etoruria no hekiga (Etruscan frescoes). Tokyo: Iwanami Shoten, 1985. . Text by M.パロッティ-ノ et al.
 Mikeranjero Vatikan hekiga / Michelangelo's Frescoes in the Vatican. 2 vols. Tokyo: Kōdansha, 1985–6. Vol. 1, ; vol. 2, . Text (in Japanese only) by Yoshiyuki Morita.  Captions in both Japanese and English.
Cellini. Abbeville, 1985. . Text by John Pope-Hennessy; principal photography by David Finn, additional photography by Okamura.
The Art of Florence. 2 vols. New York: Abbeville, 1988. . 2 vols. Artabras, 1994. . 1 vol (?). Artabras, 1999. . Text by Glenn M. Andres, John M. Hunisak, and A. Richard Turner. Also in a French edition (L'art de Florence). 
 Firentse no bijutsu. 2 vols. Tokyo: NHK, 1991. .
 Pittura etrusca al Museo di Villa Giulia. Studi di archeologia, 6. Rome: De Luca, 1989. . . Text by Maria Antonietta Rizzo.
 La Cappella Sistina. 3 vols. Milano : Rizzoli, 1989–. . 44 cm tall. Introduction by Frederick Hartt, commentary by Gianluigi Colalucci. 1. La preistoria della Bibbia 1989. 2. Antenati di Cristo. 1989. . 3. Storia della creazione. 1990. .
La Cappella Sistina. Vol. 4, Il guidizio universale. Text by Pierluigi De Vecchi, Gianluigi Colalucci. Translation of New light on Michelangelo in the Sistine Chapel. Milano: Rizzoli, c1995.  
 Mikeranjero Shisutīna reihaidō: Saigo no shinban / Michelangelo/la Cappella Sistina. Tokyo: Nippon Television Network Corp, 1996. . 
The Sistine Chapel. 2 vols. New York: Knopf, 1991. . Barrie and Jenkins, 1991. . 44 cm. Text by Frederick Hartt, Fabrizio Mancinelli and Gianluigi Colalucci. Translation of La Cappella Sistina.
 Mikeranjero Shisutīna reihaidō.　日本テレビ放送網, 1990–1.
 Vol. 1, 
 Vol. 2 Kyũyaku no sekai 2, Tenchi sōzō. 
 Vol. 3, . 
 Dai-Vachikan-ten katarogu. Tokyo: Sogō, 1993.
Treasures of the Uffizi, Florence. Abbeville, 1996. . Co-photographed with Paolo Tosi, edited by Abigail Asher.
 Shisutīna reihaidō: Yomigaeru Mikeranjero / La Cappella Sistina. Nippon Television Network Corp, 1998. . 
 Rōma Santa Sabīna kyōkai mokuchōhi no kenkyū. Tokyo: Chūō Kōron Bijutsu Shuppan, 2003. . Text by Sahoko Tsuji.
Michelangelo the Last Judgment: A Glorious Restoration. Abrams, 1997. . Abradale, 2000. . Text by Loren W. Partridge et al.
 Die Sixtinische Kapelle: Das jüngste Gericht. Benziger, 2002. . Text by Sandro Chierici.
Michelangelo: The Frescoes of the Sistine Chapel. New York: Abrams, 2002. . Text by Marcia B. Hall.
 Michel-Ange et les Fresques de la Chapelle Sixtine.  La Renaissance du livre, 2002. .

Sources

 Mikeranjero no Vatikan hekiga: Okamura Takashi Shashinten / The Vatican Frescoes of Michelangelo. Short biography on non-numbered page.

External links
 

1927 births
Japanese expatriates in Italy
Japanese photographers
Possibly living people
People from Tokyo
Nihon University alumni